General elections were held in the Faroe Islands on 8 November 1962. The Social Democratic Party emerged as the largest party in the Løgting, winning 8 of the 29 seats.

Results

References

Faroe Islands
1962 in the Faroe Islands
Elections in the Faroe Islands
November 1962 events in Europe
Election and referendum articles with incomplete results